Stewart Grand Prix was a Formula One constructor and racing team founded by triple Formula One champion Jackie Stewart and his son Paul Stewart in 1996. The team competed in F1, as the Ford works-supported team, for only three seasons, from 1997 to 1999. The 1999 season was by far its strongest, yielding one win (Johnny Herbert at the ) and one pole position (Rubens Barrichello at the ) en route to finishing fourth overall in the Constructors Championship.

At the end of 1999, Ford bought the team outright and it was renamed Jaguar Racing.

Origins
The team's origins are traced back to the end of 1988 when Jackie Stewart's son Paul set up Paul Stewart Racing, having bought the Gary Evans Motorsport Team. This team entered the 1989 British Formula 3 season with a workforce of 10 employees. The team attracted the sponsor Camel. Paul Stewart drove the car alongside German Otto Rensing. The team had a single win with Stewart at Snetterton. In 1990, the team expanded with a move to new headquarters in Milton Keynes, and was divided into three sections; preparation for European Formula 3000, Formula 3 and Formula Vauxhall Lotus. Within a few years, the team enjoyed success, winning 12 titles and 119 races in various categories.

In late 1995, Stewart Racing expressed disinterest in moving up to F1, considering that short-lived entries Simtek, Pacific and Forti either had folded or looked  likely to fold. This position was reversed in January 1996 when Jackie Stewart secured a five-year development deal with Ford to make it a factory team. Before, Ford had been in a deal as a factory engine supplier to Sauber. The team gained finance from Malaysia as a promotion for the country in general. Stewart were in consultation with John Barnard about a business plan with a budget of £24 million.

Racing history

1997
The first car named the Stewart SF01 was launched on 19 December 1996. With backing from Ford, Stewart GP entered the 1997 Australian Grand Prix with drivers Rubens Barrichello and Jan Magnussen. The only success of their first year came at the rain-affected  where Barrichello finished second. Magnussen in the second car finished just outside the points in 7th after losing his front wing at the chicane.   Elsewhere, the cars were consistent midfield runners and Barrichello was often in a position to challenge for points.  Stewart's reliability was poor, as the Ford Zetec-R V10 engine installed in the SF01 chassis proved to be extremely fragile.  This restricted the team to just eight classified finishes out of a possible thirty-four.

1998
1998 was a struggle for the team, with neither driver able to step onto the podium. Indeed, points were hard to come by, and after a number of poor drives Jan Magnussen was replaced by Dutchman Jos Verstappen, ironically the race after Magnussen scored his first and only Formula One points at the accident-laden .

In the end the driver change did not seem to make a great difference as Verstappen also struggled with the car, but he did push Barrichello harder than Magnussen. Verstappen left the team at the end of the season after Johnny Herbert joined but was less than happy with the set up of Stewart and blasted it for its favouritism to Barrichello and accused it of being unable to run more than one car.

At the end of the 1998 season, technical director Alan Jenkins left Stewart Grand Prix, and was replaced by Jordan's Gary Anderson.

1999

After Ford acquired Cosworth in July 1998, they risked designing and building a brand-new engine for 1999.   The SF3 was quick out of the box, however both cars over-heated on the grid of the first race, the Australian Grand Prix, after qualifying competitively. This put Herbert out instantly and made Barrichello start from the pit lane. Barrichello received a stop-go penalty during the race and finished 5th. The car was consistently competitive throughout the season, however the engine initially proved fragile as both cars blew their engines at the Brazilian race which meant the engine was rarely run at full power. Stewart's competitiveness was affirmed by running first in Brazil for a long spell of the race and qualifying on pole for the French Grand Prix with Barrichello. Johnny Herbert won a popular victory at the rain soaked 1999 European Grand Prix at the new Nürburgring after other leading contenders crashed off the track or lost time in the pits changing tyres. Barrichello finished third, in a result most observers indicated that Stewart deserved given their strength over the season. Johnny Herbert also became unwittingly influential in the championship at the next and penultimate race, the Malaysian Grand Prix. Running 3rd behind the Ferraris of Michael Schumacher and Eddie Irvine, a mistake in the closing laps allowed Mika Häkkinen to slip past and claim the final podium position which gave the championship contender vital points. The Ferraris were disqualified for car irregularities and the win allowed Häkkinen to gain his second championship. The Stewarts as a result finished 2nd and 3rd in the race. However Ferrari won an appeal and the initial result was reinstated. Häkkinen however went on to win the championship and Stewart came 4th in the Constructors Championship beating teams such as Williams and Benetton. Stewart's last race was the 1999 Japanese Grand Prix.

After Ford increased its commitment by buying the team out, it became known as Jaguar Racing for the 2000 season. Poor results however, led to the team being sold for the 2005 season, becoming Red Bull Racing.

Complete Formula One results
(key)

References

Formula One constructors
Formula One entrants
British auto racing teams
British racecar constructors
Auto racing teams established in 1996
Auto racing teams disestablished in 1999
British Formula Three teams